The National League (LN), former National People's Movement (RLN) is a minor Polish political party which did not contest the 2005 election, but was instead formed by MPs elected on other parties' lists in 2007.

Since 2019 The party is in Konfederacja Wolność i Niepodległość, a nationalist, conservative and monarchist coalition of parties running in the 2019 polish elections.

Election results

Sejm

Presidential

2007 establishments in Poland
Conservative parties in Poland
Catholic political parties
Eurosceptic parties in Poland
Far-right political parties in Poland
Nationalist parties in Poland
National Democracy
Polish nationalist parties
Political parties established in 2007
Political parties in Poland